"" (I do desire dearly) is a German hymn, with lyrics written in 1599 by Christoph Knoll, with a melody adapted from a secular song by Hans Leo Hassler. It is a prayer for a blessed death, beginning "" (I do desire dearly a blessed end). Its hymn tune, Zahn No. 5385a, was later also used for Paul Gerhardt's "" and "".

History and lyrics 
Knoll wrote the "" (spiritual song for the dying) "" (I desire dearly a blessed end) during the plague of 1599. It became known already during his lifetime. It appeared in Görlitz in 1613 in the hymnal Harmoniae sacrae.

Hymn tune 

The tune, "Befiehl du deine Wege" (Zahn No. 5385a), was written by Hans Leo Hassler around 1600 for a secular love song, "", which first appeared in print in the 1601 . It was combined with the sacred text "", first in Brieg in an organ tablature. It was first printed with this text in 1613 in Görlitz in the hymnal . Johann Crüger published it in 1640 in his hymnal . He used the same tune for Paul Gerhardt's hymn "" (In English: "O Sacred Head, Now Wounded"), in his Praxis pietatis melica which was published in 1656. The rhythmic melody in phrygian mode was later sung in regular meter. Its phrygian mode and ambiguous harmonies contribute to the affekt of sadness common to all three texts. The hymn appears in 52 hymnals.

Musical settings 
The hymn was used as the base for a 1640 composition by Johann Crüger and a four-part setting by Samuel Scheidt, written in 1650. Johann Pachelbel used it in part 3 of his chorale preludes on hymns about dying, . Georg Philipp Telemann wrote a cantata of the title, translated to singable English as My longing is unbounded, for the feast of Purification. Johann Sebastian Bach used the hymn in his chorale prelude, BWV 727, and for his Weimar cantata .

Johannes Brahms composed two chorale preludes as part of his Eleven Chorale Preludes, Op. 122, in 1896. Max Reger composed a chorale prelude as No. 14 of his 52 Chorale Preludes, Op. 67 in 1902. Jahn Topeit (born 1967) composed a setting for three instruments, titled  (Reflections on the chorale ...), published by Hofmeister in 1998.  wrote a partita for organ, translated to "My Heart Is Filled With Longing / Partita about dying blessedly. Paul Simon used it for the basis of his song American Tune.

References

External links 
 Liederkunde zum Evangelischen Gesangbuch
 "Herzlich tut mich verlangen" / Ewigkeitslied zu Philipper 1, 23–24, christliche-gedichte.de (in German)
 

17th-century hymns in German
Lutheran hymns
1611 works